The Huyler Building is a historic commercial and office building located in downtown Buffalo in Erie County, New York. It was built in 1926, and is a four-story, four bay, reinforced concrete building faced in cast stone and brick in the Classical Revival-style. The front facade features three large segmental-arched display windows,  balustraded balconet, and carved "Huyler's" logo with flanking griffons.  Some of the interior commercial space at 376 Delaware was installed by Antonin Raymond (1888-1976) in 1939–1940.  It was originally built for the Huyler's candy company and for over 80 years occupied by the locally prominent Pitt Petri store.

It was listed on the National Register of Historic Places in 2012.

References

Commercial buildings on the National Register of Historic Places in New York (state)
Neoclassical architecture in New York (state)
Commercial buildings completed in 1926
Buildings and structures in Buffalo, New York
National Register of Historic Places in Buffalo, New York